Joshua Redman (born February 1, 1969) is an American jazz saxophonist and composer. He is the son of jazz saxophonist Dewey Redman (1931–2006).

Life and career
Joshua Redman was born in Berkeley, California, to jazz saxophonist Dewey Redman and dancer and librarian Renee Shedroff. He is Jewish. He was exposed to many kinds of music at the Center for World Music in Berkeley, where his mother studied South Indian dance. Some of his earliest lessons in music and improvisation were on recorder with gamelan player Jody Diamond. He was exposed at an early age to a variety of musics and instruments and began playing clarinet at age nine before switching to what became his primary instrument, the tenor saxophone, one year later. Redman cites John Coltrane, Ornette Coleman, Cannonball Adderley, his father Dewey Redman, as well as the Beatles, Aretha Franklin, the Temptations, Earth, Wind and Fire, Prince, the Police and Led Zeppelin as musical influences.

Redman graduated from Berkeley High School, class of 1986, after having been a part of the award-winning Berkeley High School Jazz Ensemble for all four years of high school. After graduation, Joshua frequented the classroom jam sessions of Bay Area pianist and professor of music (at Laney College in Oakland, California), Ed Kelly. It was there that he performed alongside saxophonist Robert Stewart.

In 1991, he graduated summa cum laude with a degree in Social Studies from Harvard University, where he was a member of Phi Beta Kappa Society. He had already been accepted by Yale Law School, but deferred entrance for what he believed was only going to be one year. Some of his friends had recently relocated to Brooklyn, and they were looking for another housemate to help with the rent. Redman accepted their invitation to move in, and almost immediately he found himself immersed in the New York jazz scene. He began jamming and gigging regularly with some of the leading jazz musicians of his generation and that of his father, including Brad Mehldau, Peter Martin, Mark Turner, Peter Bernstein, Roy Hargrove, Christian McBride, Kevin Hays, Jorge Rossy, Pat Metheny, Charlie Haden and Billy Higgins, among others.

Redman won the Thelonious Monk International Jazz Saxophone Competition in 1991, and began focusing on his musical career. He was signed by Warner Bros. Records and issued his first self-titled album in the spring of 1993, which subsequently earned Redman his first Grammy nomination. He continued to develop his style throughout the 1990s, beginning with a sideman appearance on Elvin Jones' Youngblood alongside Javon Jackson, and following up with an appearance on his father Dewey's 1992 record Choices. On his second album as a leader, Wish, he was joined by a notable lineup consisting of guitarist Pat Metheny, bassist Charlie Haden and drummer Billy Higgins; this group then toured as The Joshua Redman Quartet, featuring Christian McBride in place of Charlie Haden. He continued to work with various quartets, including one with pianist Brad Mehldau until forming a new trio, Elastic, with keyboardist Sam Yahel and drummer Brian Blade. The trio debuted under the moniker Yaya3, producing one album under this name. The same group of musicians made up the core on Redman's Elastic album, before becoming known as the Joshua Redman Elastic Band. Some of his works were featured on The Weather Channel's Local on the 8s. Redman performed in a fictitious supergroup, "The Louisiana Gator Boys", in the 1998 film Blues Brothers 2000, performing on "How Blue Can You Get?" and "New Orleans".

2000s
In 1999, Joshua Redman was immortalized in the children's TV show Arthur on PBS. He appeared in the tenth episode of the fourth season, where it was rumored by the characters that he would get in a fight with famed cellist Yo-Yo Ma, who also appeared in the episode.

In 2000, Redman was named Artistic Director for the Spring Season of the non-profit jazz-presenting organization SFJAZZ. Redman co-founded the SFJAZZ with Executive Director Randall Kline, as the SFJAZZ Collective, an ensemble distinguished by the creativity of its members and a primary emphasis on composition.

In 2004, Redman first sat in with Umphrey's McGee at their performance in Boston, Massachusetts, at the Paradise Rock Club. Redman has collaborated  with Umphrey's McGee around 20 times since, including an all-improvised set in Madison, Wisconsin in January 2016.

In 2006, he performed with the New Zealand Symphony orchestra in composer John Psathas' concerto for saxophone and drumkit, Omnifenix, which was released in Rattle Records' album, View from Olympus.  The album won Best Classical Album for 2007 in the New Zealand music awards.

In March 2007, Redman announced that he was taking a hiatus from both the SFJAZZ Artistic Directorship and the SFJAZZ Collective in order to focus on new projects. In April 2007, Nonesuch released Redman's first ever piano-less trio record, Back East, featuring Joshua alongside three bass and drum rhythm sections (Larry Grenadier & Ali Jackson, Christian McBride & Brian Blade, Reuben Rogers & Eric Harland) and three guest saxophonists (Chris Cheek, Joe Lovano and Dewey Redman). His January 2009 release, Compass, continued the trio tradition, and even included some tracks with a double-trio setup, featuring saxophone, two basses and two drummers.

2010s
Starting in late 2009, Redman began performing with a new collaborative band called James Farm, featuring pianist Aaron Parks, bassist Matt Penman and drummer Eric Harland. They released their first self-titled album on April 26, 2011 and their follow-up album, City Folk on October 27, 2014.

In 2011, Redman was also an inaugural member of the Independent Music Awards' judging panel to support independent artists.

In early 2013, it was announced that Redman would release a new collection of vintage and contemporary ballads featuring a jazz quartet and an orchestral ensemble titled Walking Shadows. Produced by Redman's friend and frequent collaborator Brad Mehldau, the album also features Larry Grenadier (bass) and Brian Blade (drums). It was released on May 7, 2013 on Nonesuch. About Walking Shadows, the New York Times says "there hasn’t been a more sublimely lyrical gesture in his 20-year recording career."

On Sunday, December 8, 2013, Redman joined a group of jazz all-stars onstage at the Kennedy Center Honors in Washington, DC, to pay tribute to honoree Herbie Hancock in performance. The event aired on December 29, 2013 on CBS.

In 2015, Redman received his third Grammy nomination for his solo on "Friend or Foe" from the album The Bad Plus Joshua Redman.

In addition to his own projects, Redman has recorded and performed with musicians including Joey Alexander, Brian Blade, Ray Brown, Dave Brubeck, Chick Corea, The Dave Matthews Band, Jack DeJohnette, Bill Frisell, Aaron Goldberg, Larry Goldings, Charlie Haden, Herbie Hancock, Roy Hargrove, Roy Haynes, Billie Higgins, Milt Jackson, Elvin Jones, Quincy Jones, Big Daddy Kane, Geoff Keezer, B.B. King, The Lincoln Center Jazz Orchestra, Letieres Leite & Orkestra Rumpilezz, DJ Logic, Joe Lovano, Yo Yo Ma, Branford Marsalis, Christian McBride, John Medeski, Brad Mehldau, Pat Metheny, Marcus Miller, Paul Motian, Meshell Ndegeocello, Leon Parker, Nicholas Payton, John Psathas, Simon Rattle, Dewey Redman, Dianne Reeves, Melvin Rhyne, The Rolling Stones, The Roots, Kurt Rosenwinkel, John Scofield, Soulive, String Cheese Incident, Clark Terry, Toots Thielemans, The Trondheim Jazz Orchestra, Mark Turner, McCoy Tyner, Umphrey’s McGee, US3, Bugge Wesseltoft, Cedar Walton, Stevie Wonder and Sam Yahel.

Discography

Studio albums

As lead artist

As Joshua Redman Quartet

As Joshua Redman Elastic Band

With James Farm

With Yaya3

As featured artist

Live albums

As lead artist

As Joshua Redman Quartet

As sideman
Bob Thiele Collective, Louis Satchmo (Red Baron, 1991)
John Hicks, Friends Old and New (Novus, 1992)
Elvin Jones, Youngblood (Enja, 1992)
Joe Lovano, Tenor Legacy (Blue Note, 1993)
Paul Motian, Paul Motian and the Electric Bebop Band (JMT, 1993)
Milt Jackson, The Prophet Speaks (Qwest, 1994)
Christian McBride, Gettin' to It (Verve, 1995)
Lionel Hampton, For The Love of Music (MoJazz, 1995)
Jonny King, Notes from the Underground (Enja, 1996)
Chick Corea, Remembering Bud Powell (Stretch, 1997)
Cedar Walton, Roots (Astor Place, 1997)
McCoy Tyner Super Group, Prelude and Sonata (Key'stone, 1998)
Kurt Rosenwinkel, Deep Song (Verve, 2005)
Sam Yahel, Truth and Beauty (Origin, 2007)
Brad Mehldau, Highway Rider (Nonesuch, 2010)
Trondheim Jazz Orchestra, Triads and More (MNJ, 2010)
Ferenc Nemeth, Triumph (Dreamer's Collective, 2012)

Awards and nominations

References

External links
 
 James Farm Official Website
 History by Joshua Redman at Rateyourmusic
 (New England Jazz History Database) Worcester Magazine – "Joshua Redman Launches City Jazz Fest" by Chet Williamson

African-American Jews
American jazz tenor saxophonists
American male saxophonists
American jazz soprano saxophonists
Jazz fusion saxophonists
Jazz-funk saxophonists
Jazz musicians from California
Mainstream jazz saxophonists
Soul-jazz saxophonists
Musicians from Berkeley, California
Berkeley High School (Berkeley, California) alumni
Harvard University alumni
Jewish American musicians
1969 births
Living people
African-American jazz musicians
Jewish jazz musicians
Atomic Bomb! Band members
21st-century American saxophonists
21st-century American male musicians
American male jazz musicians
SFJAZZ Collective members
21st-century African-American musicians
21st-century American Jews
20th-century African-American people
Nonesuch Records artists